Leo Michael (born July 2, 1962) is an American Anglican bishop. He is the Bishop Ordinary of the Diocese of the Holy Trinity and Great Plains of the Holy Catholic Church (Anglican Rite). Michael was consecrated by Stephen C. Reber of the United Episcopal Church of North America in April 2006. He is married to Holly and lives in Kansas City, Missouri where he serves as Rector of St. James Anglican Church.

References

External links
 Holy Catholic Church (Anglican Rite)
 St. James Anglican Church (HCC-AR)

Living people
21st-century Anglican bishops in the United States
1962 births
People from Salem district
American Continuing Anglican bishops
American Anglo-Catholics
Indian emigrants to the United States